Gary Savage (born 1970 in Ballycran, County Down) is an Irish sportsman. He played hurling with his local club Ballycran and was a member of the Down senior inter-county team from the 1990s until the 2000s.

Playing career

Club
Savage played his hurling with his local club in Ballycran and enjoyed much success.  He first came to prominence on the club’s senior team in the late 1980s, however, Ballycran were going through a hugely unsuccessful period at the time, after losing five county finals in-a-row.  Savage won his first county senior championship winners’ medal in 1993, following a defeat of Ballygalget.  He later lined out in the Ulster club final with Cushendall providing the opposition.  A 2-10 to 0-12 victory gave Savage his first Ulster club winners’ medal. Ballycran were subsequently defeated by Toomevara in the All-Ireland semi-final.

Savage added two more county titles to his collection in 1994 and 1995.  After more than a decade out of the limelight Ballycran bounced back in 2007, with Savage adding a fourth county winners’ medal to his collection.

Inter-county
Savage first came to prominence on the inter-county scene as a member of the Down senior hurling team in the early 1990s. It was the beginning of the county's most successful period ever.

In 1992 Savage won his first Ulster winners' medal following a 2-16 to 0-11 defeat of provincial kingpins Antrim. The ‘Mourne’ men later made their first-ever championship visit to Croke Park.  The All-Ireland semi-final pitted them against Cork. The game saw Savage's side nearly cause an upset, however, in the end Cork won by 2-17 to 1-11.  

After surrendering their provincial title to Antrim in 1993 and 1994, Savage added a second Ulster memento to his collection in 1995 following a thrilling draw and a replay of the provincial decider. An unconvincing defeat of London in the All-Ireland quarter-final allowed Down to advance to the semi-final where reigning All-Ireland champions Offaly provided the opposition. Down played well, however, in the end Savage’s side were defeated by 2-19 to 2-8.

Two years later in 1997 Down regained the Ulster title, with Savage adding a third provincial winners’ medal to his collection. The introduction of the so-called ‘back-door’ system saw Down later face Tipperary in the All-Ireland quarter-final at Semple Stadium. That game turned into a rout, as Tipp won easily by 3-24 to 3-8. 

The next few years proved to an unhappy time for Down's hurling team as Antrim and Derry reclaimed their status as the standard-bearers in the provincial championship. Savage lined out in further Ulster finals in 2001, 2002, 2004, 2005 and 2007, however, he ended up on the losing side on all six occasions.

In 2005 a restructuring of the championship saw Down being entered in the Christy Ring Cup, effectively a competition for the ‘second-tier’ hurling teams. Clarke's side did well in their debut year and even reached the final of the competition. Westmeath provided the opposition on that occasion; however, at the full-time whistle Down were defeated by 1-23 to 2-18. The team, however, have failed to build on this in recent years.

Inter-provincial
Savage has also lined out with Ulster in the inter-provincial hurling competition. He has enjoyed little success with his province as Ulster have failed to even qualify for the Railway Cup final in recent years. Savage's most successful year with Ulster came in 1995 when the northern province took on Munster in the final. That game turned into a closed affair with Munster narrowly winning by 0-13 to 1-9.

International
Savage has also represented his country in the annual Composite rules shinty-hurling competition between Ireland and Scotland. He was a member of the panel in 2006 as Ireland were defeated by 2(5) to 2(13) by Scotland at Croke Park.

Managerial
Savage was manager of Ballycran in 2009 when they won the Down Championship in a defeat of Ballygalget. He currently works as assistant manager to Stephen McAree, where they recently secured the 2015 Down Senior Hurling Championship.

Honours
Player
 Down Senior Hurling Championship (5) 1993 1994 1995 2007 2009
 Ulster Senior Hurling Championship (3) 1992 1995 1997
 National Hurling League Division 2 (1) 2004 
 Ulster Senior Club Hurling Championship (1) 1993
Manager 
Down Senior Hurling Championship 2018
Down Senior Hurling Championship 2015
Down Senior Hurling Championship (1) 2011

References and sources
Notes

Sources
 

1981 births
Living people
Ballycran hurlers
Down inter-county hurlers
Ulster inter-provincial hurlers